Sydmonton is a small village and estate in the Basingstoke and Deane district of Hampshire, England.

Governance
The village is now part of the civil parish of Ecchinswell, Sydmonton and Bishops Green, historically having been within the parish of Kingsclere. It is part of the Burghclere, Highclere and St Mary Bourne ward of Basingstoke and Deane borough council. The borough council is a Non-metropolitan district of Hampshire County Council.

History

Sydmonton Court

Sydmonton is the home of the 5000 acre Sydmonton Court estate, formerly the seat of the Kingsmill Family, including Admiral Sir Robert Kingsmill. The estate is currently owned by Andrew Lloyd Webber, Baron Lloyd-Webber, and is home to the annual Sydmonton Festival.

The house is a grade II* listed Tudor manor house originally built to an E-shaped floor plan in the 16th century, but modified several times since then.

The estate came into the hands of the Kingsmill family after the Dissolution of the Monasteries when it was granted by Henry VIII to John Kingsmill. It passed down in the family to Elizabeth Corry, daughter of Frances Kingsmill and Hugh Corry, who married Robert Brice. Robert took the name of Kingsmill in 1766, became an admiral and was created Baronet Kingsmill in 1800. He left Sydmonton to the Rev. John Stephens, vicar of Chewton Mendip, Somerset, who also took the name of Kingsmill in 1806.

Anne Kingsmill (1661–1720), daughter of Sir William Kingsmill, married Heneage Finch and became Lady Winchilsea and a well-known poet.

The Sydmonton Festival is a summer arts festival presented in a deconsecrated 16th century chapel in the grounds of the estate.

References

External links

Villages in Hampshire
Basingstoke and Deane